Richard Coulter may refer to:

People
 Richard Coulter (U.S. politician) (1788–1852), U.S. Representative from Pennsylvania
 Richard Coulter (general) (1827–1908), American Civil War general
 Richard Coulter Jr. (1870–1955), World War I general and banker

Other uses
 SS Richard Coulter, a Liberty ship built in the United States during World War II

See also
 Richard Coulter Drum (1825–1909),United States Army general
 Richard Samuel Colter (1878–1950), Canadian lawyer and politician